Shazz, (born Didier Delesalle, 1967) is a French record producer and remixer.

Shazz is the alias for Soul house and Jazz.

Shazz is one of the first artists signed to the label Fnac Music Dance Division. He collaborated with Ludovic Navarre (Saint Germain) under the name L'n'S, and with Laurent Garnier under the name "Choice"

Shazz has also produced music in this musical genre and has been releasing records for French musical labels since 1992. His El Camino part 1 was used in the 1998 film Homeboys at the Beach.

In the late 1990s, Shazz signed with a major label Columbia Records. With his second album In The Light (Epic Records), composed in the space of one year, Shazz combined house, pop and African-American music. His third album Beautiful was more song-based.

Albums 
1998 - Shazz (Columbia/ en 2000 sur Distance records)
2001 - In The Light (Epic Records)
2002 - In The Night (Album de remixes, Epic Records)
2004 - Beautiful (ULM)
2005 - Human? (Naïve Records)
2009 - Heritage with Michael Robinson (Wagram)

Maxis 
1992 - Moonflower (12" / CD, Maxi) Fnac Music Dance Division
1992 - Shazz EP (12" / CD, Maxi) Fnac Music Dance Division 	
1993 - Lost Illusions (12" / CD, Maxi) Fnac Music Dance Division 	
1994 - A View Of Manhattan (CD, Maxi / 12", EP) F Communications
1996 - Back In Manhattan (CD, Single)F Communications
1996 - Muse Q The Music (CD, Maxi) F Communications 	
1997 - El Camino (Part 2) (12") Yellow Productions 	
1997 - Lost Illusions (CD, Maxi) CNR Music 	
1997 - Moonflower (CD, Maxi) CNR Music 	
1998 - El Camino (Part 1) (12") Yellow Productions 	
1998 - El Camino Project (CD, Maxi) Yellow Productions 	
1998 - Innerside (12") Yellow Productions,  en 2002 sur Epic	
1998 - Innerside (CD, Single) Columbia Records 	
1998 - Yellow Dance Classics (12")Yellow Productions 	
1999 - Carry On (12") Sony Music Entertainment (France) 	
1999 - Innerside '99 Remixes - Part 1 (12") Distance Records
1999 - Pray (12") Distance / Promo sur Epic	
1999 - Pray (Bob Sinclar Remixes) (12" sur Columbia / CD Maxi sur Distance)	
2001 - Fallin' In Love (12")Epic 	
2001 - Hermosa Maria (12") Epic 	
2002 - All I Wanna Give You (Part 5 / 5) (12")Epic 	
2002 - El Camino Part 1/5 (12") Epic 	
2002 - Fallin' In Love & Hermosa Maria (Part 4 / 5) (12")Epic 	
2002 - Pray / Carry On (Remixes Part 3 / 5) (12")Epic 	
2004 - Beautiful (Mixed CD Sampler) (CD, Promo) Universal Licensing Music (ULM)
2004 - On & On / Latin Break EP (CD, Maxi / 12", EP) Universal Licensing Music (ULM) 	
2005 - My Heart (12") Universal Licensing Music (ULM) 	
2006 - This Is Your Life (12") Shazz Music
2008 - Mazz (Max Campo & Shazz present) Flashback 90/Musik sequence (Digital) Resolution Records

Remixes 
1994 - Habibe (2x12", Promo) 	Habibe (Shazz Deep) 	
1995 - Manureva (Shazz Mixes) (12", Promo, W/Lbl) Epic 	
1995 - The Tunnel (Remixes) (12") The Tunnel (Shazz & Tommy Marcus) Resolution Records
1995 - Bohème (The Remixes) (CD, Maxi) Bohème (Abstract Mix) 	Sony Music Entertainment (France) 	
1995 - Boheme (2xCD) 	Boheme (Orange Mix) Epic 	
1995 - Nova Nova (CD, Album) 	D.J.G.G. (Orange Mix) F Communications
1995 - Un Film Snob Pour Martien (Shazz Remixes) (12") Columbia Records	
1996 - Eau Et Vent (Remixes Shazz) (12") au Et Vent (The Awake) Columbia Records
1996 - I'm The Baddest Bitch (Remixes) (CD, Maxi) F Communications 	
1999 - Distance Sampler (CD) 	If She Only Knew (Shazz remix)Distance 	
2001 - Latin House Vol. 2 (CD) Afro-Dissiac (Choice Productions)
2002 - Natural House (2xCD) Afrodisiac (Shazz Remix) Debaile Muxxic
2003 - Afrodisiac (12") Afrodisiac (Shazz Remix) Denote Records
2004 - Mua Mua Mua - Raul Paz (Shazz Remix) Naïve Records
2004 - Here Comes The Sun (12") (Shazz & Tommy Marcus) Resolution Records
2004 - Lounge Candelas Version 2 (2xCD) Afro-Dissiac (Med Musik)

Production 
1993 - Aurora Borealis (CD, Maxi) Fnac Music Dance Division
1993 - Teknoville (2xCD) Acid Eiffel Antler-Subway 	
1996 - Technomania (2xCD) Aurora Borealis (Orange) Arcade 	
2000 - The Other Side of Absolute Ego (CD) Kyou Made No Yuuutsu (Ki/oon Records)

Mixing 
1993 - Acid Eiffel / How Do You Plead? (12") Fragile Records 	
1993 - Aurora Borealis (CD, Maxi) Fnac Music Dance Division 	
1993 - Paris EP (CD, EP)Fnac Music Dance Division 	
1994 - La Collection (2xCD) Lost Illusions (Joli M) Rough Trade Germany
1997 - Paris EP (CD, EP) CNR Music
1997 - Quarter EP (CD, Maxi) CNR Music 	
1999 - TranscenDance - The Best Of Trance (2xCD)Acid Eiffel Factory Music Productions, BMG Records (France)

Various 
1993 - Nouveau EP (CD, EP) Fnac Music Dance Division 	
1993 - Paris EP (CD, EP) Fnac Music Dance Division 	
1993 - Quarter EP (CD, EP) Fnac Music Dance Division 	
1994 - Blanc EP (CD, EP) F Communications 	
1994 - Freezone 1 - The Phenomenology Of Ambient (2xCD, Comp) 	La Couleur SSR Records 	
1994 - La Collection (2xCD) Lost Illusions (Joli M) Rough Trade Germany 	
1995 - Cyber Trance (CD + CD-ROM) Quarter 1: La Couleur  Javelin Ltd 	
1995 - Technophunk (CD) No Work Today 	Rumour Records 	
1995 - Two Years Together (CD) Intro 	Not On Label 	
1996 - Laboratoire Mix (2xCD) 	Acid Eiffel Level 2 	
1996 - No. 1 Techno (CD) Aurora Borealis PolyGram 	
1997 - The Earth EP (12", EP, TP) My Angels Basenotic Records 	
1999 - One Starry Night (Special Edition) (CD, Album + CD, Comp) If She Only Knew (Shazz Mix)Distance 	
1999 - TranscenDance - The Best Of Trance (2xCD) Acid Eiffel 	Factory Music Productions, BMG
2002 - Paradisiac 4 (2xCD, Dig) Lounging Around ULM Electro
2003 - Bar Lounge Classics Summer Edition (CD, Dig + CD)Lounging Around Sony Music Media (Germany) 	
2003 - Erotic Lounge (Deluxe Edition) (2xCD) 	Fallin' In Love Sony Music Media (Germany) 	
2003 - French Power (CD) Fallin' In Love Sony Music Entertainment (Poland) 	
2004 - Osunlade Presents The Yoruba Soul Mixes (3x12") All I Wanna Give You Rapster Records
2004 - Vocal Jazz - Les nouvelles voix du jazz (CD) ULM TV Market
2006 - The Kings Of Techno (2xCD) Acid Eiffel 	Rapster Records 	
2007 - Back In The Box (2xCD, Sli) El Camino (DJ Gregory remix) NRK Sound Division 	
2007 - Josh Wink's Acid Classics (CD) 	Acid Eiffel Mixmag 	
2008 - Elegant Funk (CD, Promo) Carry On Savage!
2008 - Hotel Costes n°11 (CD) Mirage, Hello Mademoiselle Shazz Remix, Pschent Music

References

External links 
 
 Personal website
 Marshall, Kingsley "[ In The Light Review]", Allmusic, Macrovision Corporation

French house musicians
Living people
1967 births